Oceanco is a privately owned custom yacht builder, based in the Netherlands, that builds full displacement yachts in the  range since 1987. It is owned by Mohammed Al Barwani, an Omani billionaire.

History
Oceanco came into existence in 1987, when a group of South African private investors under the guidance of then CEO, Richard Hein, began yacht-building, with the hulls and superstructures built in Durban, South Africa. The yachts were then transported to various facilities in the Netherlands where the finishing work took place.

In 2002, Theodore Angelopoulos took control of Oceanco and embarked on a new building strategy focusing on the niche market of 80m+ megayachts and developed the “Y Generation” of Oceanco yachts which included Amevi (Y701),  and Alfa Nero (Y702) . 

In 2008, the  Anastasia was launched and in May 2009, the company launched the  Vibrant Curiosity with her amidships atrium, a  pool and large interior volumes designed by Nuvolari & Lenard.

In March 2010, Mohammed Al Barwani, a private investor based in the Sultanate of Oman, acquired Oceanco. Marcel Onkenhout, who has been with the company for 20 years, is the CEO.

Oceanco delivered Sunrays, an  megayacht in March 2010. The late Björn Johansson designed her exterior lines and the interior design is by Terence Disdale. She was succeeded by the  Nuvolari & Lenard designed Man of Steel (ex-Seven Seas), delivered in November 2010. The Sam Sorgiovanni designed  Nirvana was delivered in spring 2012, followed by St. Princess Olga (renamed Amore Vero)  in 2013, 
Equanimity  in 2014 and 
Infinity  in 2015.

, the largest yacht built by Oceanco was Jubilee (in 2017 renamed Kaos). In 2018 the yard launched "Project Bravo", a 109 m superyacht.

The company operates in its extended production facility (total of 8.2 ha) located in Alblasserdam, approximately 20 km from Rotterdam, the Netherlands. The yard has almost unrestricted direct access via the inland waterway system to the North Sea.

Oceanco has built 29 custom superyachts up to 117 m length. Several 100 m+ yachts are currently under construction. The company has the ability to simultaneously build five yachts in the 80 m+ category (at various stages of design, engineering and construction), delivering approximately two superyachts per year. In 2008 the company acquired more land adjacent to the present yard, and in 2010 they set about demolishing the old buildings and slips, to make way for a new covered dry dock, which now allows them to construct yachts up to 140 metres.

Oceanco asked for permission to temporarily remove the middle span of a historic bridge in Rotterdam known as “The Hef”, so that the yacht could sail out to sea. The proposal touched off a public outcry, with citizens threatening to throw eggs and tomatoes at the vessel as it passed, and Oceanco withdrew the request in June 2022.

Oceanco maintains a sales, design, marketing and communications office in Monaco.

See also 
List of yachts built by Oceanco

References

External links

Dutch boat builders
Dutch brands